Tinoc, officially the Municipality of Tinoc  is a 4th class municipality in the province of Ifugao, Philippines. According to the 2020 census, it has a population of 18,475 people.

Geography

Barangays
Tinoc is politically subdivided into 12 barangays. These barangays are headed by elected officials: Barangay Captain, Barangay Council, whose members are called Barangay Councilors. All are elected every three years.
 Ahin
 Ap-apid
 Binablayan
 Danggo
 Eheb
 Gumhang
 Impugong
 Luhong
 Tinoc (Poblacion)
 Tukucan
 Tulludan
 Wangwang

Climate

Demographics

Religion
Evangelical and Protestant churches have a strong presence with 48% adherence. There is a significant presence of catholic and animisim.

Economy

Government
Tinoc, belonging to the lone congressional district of the province of Ifugao, is governed by a mayor designated as its local chief executive and by a municipal council as its legislative body in accordance with the Local Government Code. The mayor, vice mayor, and the councilors are elected directly by the people through an election which is being held every three years.

Elected officials

References

External links
 [ Philippine Standard Geographic Code]
Philippine Census Information
Local Governance Performance Management System

Municipalities of Ifugao